Bert Henderson may refer to:

Bert Henderson (footballer), Scottish football player (Dundee FC, St. Mirren) and manager (Arbroath FC)
Bert Henderson, Crossroads character played by Victor Maddern

See also
Albert Henderson (disambiguation)
Robert Henderson (disambiguation)
Herbert Henderson (disambiguation)